William Hinsche (June 29, 1951 – November 20, 2021) was an American musician who was a co-founding member of the singing trio Dino, Desi & Billy and a keyboardist for the Beach Boys' backing band.

Background
Hinsche was born in Manila, the Philippines, the son of Celia Bautista and Otto "Doc" Hinsche, who owned a local casino. His father was from New Jersey and his mother was a Filipina. The family moved to the United States and settled in Beverly Hills. Hinsche attended Loyola High School, where he met Desi Arnaz, Jr. and Dean Paul Martin. The three later formed the group Dino, Desi & Billy and signed with Frank Sinatra's record label Reprise Records.

In the late 1960s, Hinsche began to work as a session musician for The Beach Boys. Although he declined at least one offer to formally join the group in favor of continuing his education in August 1969, he toured extensively with the band as a vocalist and multi-instrumentalist (often playing keyboards and rhythm guitar) from 1971 to 1977 and 1982 to 1996. His sister, Annie Hinsche-Wilson-Karges, was married to the group's guitarist, Carl Wilson. He earned a B.F.A. from the University of California, Los Angeles School of Theater, Film and Television in 1974.

Billy Hinsche provided backing vocals on recordings for Elton John's "Don't Let The Sun Go Down On Me," Warren Zevon's "Desperados Under The Eaves," America's "Hat Trick," Joan Jett's "Good Music" and others.

Hinsche died after a short battle with lung cancer on November 20, 2021. His mother, Celia Hinsche, also died on the same day.

Discography

Singles with Dino, Desi & Billy
Since You Broke My Heart / We Know—Reprise 0324—released 11-2-64
I'm A Fool / So Many Ways—Reprise 0367–4-12-65
I'm A Fool / So Many Ways /Since You Broke My Heart / We Know—Reprise 60072 ep (France) -- 4-12-65
Not The Lovin' Kind / Chimes Of Freedom—Reprise 0401–8-18-65
Please Don't Fight It / The Rebel Kind—Reprise 0426–11-10-65
Superman / I Can't Get Her Off My Mind—Reprise 0444–1-19-66
Tie Me Down / It's Just The Way You Are—Reprise 0462–3-23-66
Look Out Girls (Here We Come) / She's So Far Out She's In—Reprise 0469–5-20-66
I Hope She's There Tonight / Josephine—Reprise 0529–10-12-66
If You're Thinkin' What I'm Thinkin' / Pretty Flamingo—Reprise 0544–12-13-66
Two in the Afternoon / Good Luck, Best Wishes to You—Reprise 0579–4-19-67
Kitty Doyle / Without Hurtin' Some—Reprise 0619–8-2-67
My What a Shame / The Inside Outside Caspar Milquetoast Eskimo Flash—Reprise 0653
Tell Someone You Love Them / General Outline—Reprise 0698–5-29-68
Thru Spray Colored Glasses / Someday—Uni 55127
Hawley / Let's Talk it Over—Columbia 4-44975–1969
Lady Love / A Certain Sound—Reprise 0965–10-14-70
Under A Beach Boy Moon -- (Digital Release Only) -- RD&B Records LLC—5-4-12

Albums with Dino, Desi & Billy
I'm a Fool -- Reprise R (Mono)/RS (Stereo) 6176—U.S. #51, 9/65
Our Time's Coming—Reprise R/RS 6194—U.S. #119, 2/66
Memories Are Made of This—Reprise R/RS 6198–1966
Souvenir—Reprise R/RS 6224–1966
Follow Me (1969 film) Original Soundtrack -- Uni ST73056–1969
The Rebel Kind: The Best of Dino, Desi & Billy -- Sundazed, 1996

Albums with Ricci, Desi & Billy
Live In Vegas—RD&B Records, LLC—2001
Live From Boulder City—RD&B Records, LLC—2002

Albums with The Beach Boys
 Beach Boys' Party! (1965)
 Smiley Smile (1967)
 Carl and the Passions – "So Tough" (1972)
 Holland (1973)
 In Concert (1973)
 15 Big Ones (1976)
 Love You (1977)
 M.I.U. Album (1978)
 L.A. (Light Album) (1979)
 Songs from Here & Back (2006)

Albums with Carl Wilson of The Beach Boys
 Carl Wilson (1981)
 Youngblood (1983)

Films 
 Murderer's Row (1966)
 Play Songs of the Beach Boys: Piano Accompaniments to Rock Classics - MFM Productions[VHS]
 Dennis Wilson Forever - Sony/Bmg Int'l - [DVD] 2008
 1974 - On The Road With The Beach Boys - MFM Productions - [DVD] 2009
 Carl Wilson - Here and Now - MFM Productions - [DVD] 2011
 24 HOURS - MFM Productions - [DVD] 2011
 Know the Road (Redux) - MFM Productions - [DVD] 2012
 Home Movies - MFM Productions - [DVD] 2012
 Dean Martin: King of Cool - Appian Way/Danny Strong Productions - TCM 2021

References

External links 
 
 Billy Hinsche at MySpace
 
 
 
 Billy Hinsche at Find a Grave

1951 births
2021 deaths
American musicians of Filipino descent
American pop guitarists
American pop rock musicians
American pop rock singers
American television composers
Burials at Westwood Village Memorial Park Cemetery
Filipino emigrants to the United States
UCLA Film School alumni
People from Manila
The Beach Boys backing band members
American male guitarists
20th-century American guitarists
20th-century American male singers
20th-century American singers